Rand Iyad Jawdat Abu-Hussein (born 1 March 1997), known as Rand Abu-Hussein, is a Jordanian footballer who plays as a defender for local Women's League club Shabab Al-Ordon and the Jordan women's national team.

References 

1997 births
Living people
Jordan women's international footballers
Jordanian women's footballers
Women's association football defenders
Sportspeople from Amman
Jordan Women's Football League players